James F. Brennan (July 23, 1916 – July 28, 2002) was a Massachusetts politician who served as the 29th Mayor of Somerville, Massachusetts.

Notes

2002 deaths
Mayors of Somerville, Massachusetts
1916 births